Fazalur Rehman (15 March 1941 – 9 March 2023) was a Pakistani field hockey player. He competed in  men's tournament at the 1968 Summer Olympics in Mexico and was part of team that won gold medal . He competed in the men's tournament at the 1972 Summer Olympics, and was part of team that won the silver medal.

Rehman died on 9 March 2023, at the age of 81.

References

External links
 

1941 births
2023 deaths
Pakistani male field hockey players
Olympic field hockey players of Pakistan
Field hockey players at the 1972 Summer Olympics
Olympic silver medalists for Pakistan
Olympic medalists in field hockey
Medalists at the 1972 Summer Olympics
Field hockey players at the 1970 Asian Games
Medalists at the 1970 Asian Games
Asian Games gold medalists for Pakistan
Place of birth missing (living people)
20th-century Pakistani people